In Jainism, the word Śrāvaka or Sāvaga (from Jain Prakrit) is used to refer the Jain laity (householder). The word śrāvaka has its roots in the word śrāvana, i.e. the one who listens (the discourses of the saints).

The tirthankara restores or organises the sangha, a fourfold order of muni (male monastics), aryika (female monastics),  śrāvakas (male followers) and śrāvikās (female followers).

In Jainism, there are two kinds of votaries:
The householder (one with minor vows)
The homeless ascetic (one with major vows)

According to the Jain text Puruşārthasiddhyupāya:

Ratnakaranda śrāvakācāra, a major Jain text, discusses the conduct of a Śrāvaka in detail.

Six essentials 

In Jainism, six essential duties (avashyakas) are prescribed for a śrāvaka. These help the laity in achieving the principle of ahimsa which is necessary for his/her spiritual upliftment. The six duties are:
Worship of Pañca-Parameṣṭhi (five supreme beings)
Following the preachings of Jain saints
Study of Jain scriptures
Sāmāyika (Vow of periodic concentration)
Following discipline in their daily engagement
Charity (dāna) of four kinds:
Ahara-dāna – donation of food
Ausadha-dāna – donation of medicine
Jnana-dāna – donation of knowledge
Abhaya-dāna – saving the life of a living being or giving of protection to someone under threat

Twelve Vows 

Jain ethical code prescribes five main vows and seven supplementary vows, which include three guņa vratas and four śikşā vratas.

Mahavratas 
In Jainism, both ascetics and householders have to follow five vows (vratas) compulsorily. These five vows are:
Ahiṃsā – Not to hurt any living being by actions and thoughts. Out of the five types of living beings, a householder is forbidden to kill, or destroy, intentionally, all except the lowest (the one sensed, such as vegetables, herbs, cereals, etc., which are endowed with only the sense of touch).
Satya – to lie or speak what is not commendable
Asteya – Not to take anything if not given
Brahmacharya (Chastity) – Refraining from indulgence in sex-passion
Aparigraha (Non-possession) – Detachment from material property

Anuvratas

Guņa vratas 
digvrata – Restriction on movement with regard to directions
bhogopabhogaparimana – Vow of limiting consumable and non-consumable things
anartha-dandaviramana – Refraining from harmful occupations and activities (purposeless sins)

Śikşā vratas 
Samayika – Vow to meditate and concentrate periodically. The sāmayika vrata (vow to meditate) is intended to be observed three times a day if possible; other-wise at least once daily. Its objective is to enable the śrāvaka to abstain from all kinds of sins during the period of time fixed for its observance. The usual duration of the sāmayika vow is an antara mūharta (a period of time not exceeding 48 minutes).  During this period, which the layman spends in study and meditation, he vows to refrain from the commission of the five kinds of sin — injury, falsehood, theft, unchastity and love of material possessions in any of the three ways. These three ways are:
by an act of mind, speech or body (krita)
inciting others to commit such an act (kārita)
approving the commission of such an act by others (anumodanā)

In performing sāmayika the śrāvaka has to stand facing north or east and bow to the Pañca-Parameṣṭhi. He then sit down and recites the Namokara mantra a certain number of times, and finally devotes himself to holy meditation. Sāmayika can be performed anywhere- a temple, private residence, forest and the like. But the place shouldn't be open to disturbance of any kind.

Desavrata — Limiting movement to certain places for a fixed period of time.
Upvas — Fasting at regular intervals
Atihti samvibhag — Vow of offering food to the ascetic and needy people

A householder who observes these vows is called , i.e., one who observes abstinence as well as non-abstinence.

Sallekhanā 

A householder who has observed all the prescribed vows to shed the karmas, takes the vow of sallekhanā at the end of his life. According to the Jain text, Puruşārthasiddhyupāya, "sallekhana enable a householder to carry with him his wealth of piety". The Sallekhana, a voluntary vow of self-starvation if the vows are impossible to uphold by reducing eating of food and partaking of liquids or die while engrossed in meditation with equanimity of mind. Sallekhana is preserving the loss of karma which would be impeded and prevent the further effacing of grief, fear, anger, affection, hatred, prejudice e.t.c. and other afflictions with or without his knowledge in contravening Right Faith, Right Thought and Right Conduct nearing the end of life after vows and austerities have had their beneficial karma on the world by their sacrifice, giving, restraint, pure thoughts and by listening, forgiving e.t.c.. A Jain man or women with vows spends much time on prayer and scripture freed from pleasure and passion.

See also 

 Sarak
 Pratima (Jainism)
 Tapas (Indian religions)
 Tapas (Jain religion)

References

Sources 

 
 

 
 Alt URL

Jain sangha